Kelly Yu Wenwen (born 7 November 1989) is a Chinese Canadian singer, songwriter, and actress.

Personal life 
Yu was born in Dalian, China and moved with her parents to Vancouver, British Columbia in 2004. She attended Killarney Secondary School and later moved to Boston, where she attended the Berklee College of Music.

Career 
Yu's first movie was Under the Rain in 2012, directed by Liu Chen. Her first lead role was in 2014 in the television series One and a Half Summer pairing up with Nichkhun.

In 2017, Yu starred as lead actress in the romantic film The Ex-File 3: The Return of the Exes. She sang the theme song of the film.

On Christmas Day of 2022, Kelly announced via Weibo where she will be reprising her role as Lin Jia from Ex-File 3 with other key members returning too.

Filmography

Film

Drama series

Television shows

Discography

Albums

Singles

Awards and nominations

References

External links 
 

1989 births
Living people
Actresses from Dalian
People from Dalian
Singers from Liaoning
21st-century Chinese actresses
Chinese film actresses
Chinese television actresses
21st-century Chinese women singers